Ban Phlu Ta Luang railway station is a railway station located in Phlu Ta Luang Subdistrict, Sattahip District, Chon Buri. It is a class 3 railway station located 184.033 km from Bangkok railway station. It is the current terminus of the operational train from Bangkok.

The station opened in July 1989 as part of the Eastern Line Chachoengsao Junction–Sattahip Port section. In the past, freight trains continued further down the line to Sattahip's Juk Samet Port. In 2002-2003, some services continued down the line to Jamboree Station, built specially for the 20th World Scout Jamboree held in Sattahip. However, services (both freight and passenger) beyond Ban Phlu Ta Luang have now ceased operations. A new station built for U-Tapao International Airport is currently under construction and once open, will be the new terminus of the line.

Train services 
 Train No. 283/284 Bangkok–Ban Phlu Ta Luang–Bangkok 
 Train No. 997/998 Bangkok–Ban Phlu Ta Luang–Bangkok (Saturday and Sunday only)

References 
 
 
 

Railway stations in Thailand